Elie Aiboy (born 20 April 1979) is a former Indonesian football player who last played for Persip Pekalongan. Aiboy is a right winger known for his acceleration and dribbling skills. He has been capped 48 times and scored 8 goals for Indonesia national football team

He played for Arema Malang in the 2007 AFC Champions League group stage, where he scored one goal.

International Goals

|}

Statistics 
As of 14 May 2012.

Honours

Club honours
Selangor FA
 Malaysia Premier League (1) : 2005	
 Malaysia FA Cup (1) : 2005	
 Malaysia Cup (1) : 2005
Semen Padang
Indonesia Premier League (1): 2011–12
Indonesian Community Shield (1): 2013

Individual honours
 FA Cup Malaysia Most Valuable Player (1) : 2005

References

External links

1979 births
Living people
People from Jayapura
Papuan people
Indonesian footballers
2004 AFC Asian Cup players
2007 AFC Asian Cup players
Indonesian expatriate sportspeople in Malaysia
Expatriate footballers in Malaysia
PSB Bogor players
Persipura Jayapura players
Semen Padang F.C. players
Persija Jakarta players
Selangor FA players
Arema F.C. players
PSMS Medan players
Persidafon Dafonsoro players
Persih Tembilahan players
Indonesian expatriate footballers
Indonesia international footballers
Liga 1 (Indonesia) players
Indonesian Premier League players
Association football wingers
Sportspeople from Papua